Monnina sodiroana is a species of plant in the family Polygalaceae. It is endemic to Ecuador.

References

sodiroana
Flora of Ecuador
Endangered plants
Taxonomy articles created by Polbot